The Federation of Evangelical Religious Entities of Spain (Spanish: Federación de Entidades Religiosas Evangélicas de España or FEDERE) is a Spanish organization of Protestant denominations, mostly Evangelical in orientation.

Organizational structure
 Consejo Evangélico Autonómico de Andalucía
 Consejo Evangélico de Asturias
 Consejo Evangélico de Cantabria
 Consejo Evangélico de Castilla León
 Consejo Evangélico de Extremadura
 Consell Evangèlic de les Illes Balears
 Consejo Evangélico de Murcia
 Consejo Evangélico del País Vasco
 Consell Evangèlic de la Comunitat Valenciana
 Consejo Evangélico de Aragón
 Consejo Evangélico de Canarias
 Consejo Evangélico de Castilla La Mancha
 Consell Evangèlic de Catalunya
 Consejo Evangélico de Galicia
 Consejo Evangélico de Madrid
 Consejo Evangélico de Navarra
 Consejo Evangélico de La Rioja

See also 
 Protestantism in Spain
 Anglicanism in Spain
 Evangelical Presbyterian Church in Spain
 Reformed Churches in Spain
 Spanish Evangelical Church
 Spanish Evangelical Lutheran Church
 Union of Evangelical Baptists of Spain

External links
  Federation of Evangelical Religious Entities of Spain
 Link to Spanish Wikipedia entry

Evangelicalism in Spain